Urceolella is a genus of fungi within the Hyaloscyphaceae family. The genus contains 23 species. Species Fungorum accepts 44 species.

Species
As accepted by Species Fungorum;

 Urceolella aasii 
 Urceolella amphipila 
 Urceolella appressipila 
 Urceolella arundinella 
 Urceolella arundinis 
 Urceolella brunneola 
 Urceolella cookei 
 Urceolella corticicola 
 Urceolella crispula 
 Urceolella curvipila 
 Urceolella dryadicola 
 Urceolella elaphoides 
 Urceolella equiseti 
 Urceolella galii 
 Urceolella glacialis 
 Urceolella hirta 
 Urceolella iridis 
 Urceolella juniperi 
 Urceolella lycopodii 
 Urceolella nectrioidea 
 Urceolella nivea 
 Urceolella pallida 
 Urceolella pani 
 Urceolella papillaris 
 Urceolella peleana 
 Urceolella piceae 
 Urceolella pinicola 
 Urceolella pseudacori 
 Urceolella pseudopezizoides 
 Urceolella pulverulenta 
 Urceolella punctiformis 
 Urceolella radians 
 Urceolella rehmiana 
 Urceolella rufula 
 Urceolella salicicola 
 Urceolella saxifragae 
 Urceolella saxonica 
 Urceolella seminis 
 Urceolella stilbum 
 Urceolella struthiopteridis 
 Urceolella tetraspora 
 Urceolella todeae 
 Urceolella triseptata 
 Urceolella tuberculiformis

Former species
A lot of species of Urceolella have been moved to other genera and families;

 U. absinthii  = Pyrenopeziza absinthii Ploettnerulaceae family
 U. acerina  = Mollisina acerina Pezizellaceae
 U. aconiti  = Calycella aconiti Helotiaceae
 U. aspera  = Unguicularia aspera Helotiales
 U. aspidii  = Incrupila aspidii Hyaloscyphaceae
 U. asterostoma  = Peziza asterostoma Pezizaceae
 U. atomaria  = Hyaloscypha atomaria Hyaloscyphaceae
 U. berkeleyi  = Cistella grevillei Helotiales
 U. carestiana  = Unguicularia carestiana Helotiales
 U. chionea  = Mollisia chionea Mollisiaceae
 U. cirrhata  = Hyalopeziza millepunctata Hyaloscyphaceae
 U. costata  = Unguicularia costata Helotiales
 U. deparcula  = Calycellina ulmariae Pezizellaceae
 U. dispersella  = Crocicreas dispersellum Helotiales
 U. effugiens  = Trichopeziza effugiens Lachnaceae
 U. elaphines  = Hyalopeziza millepunctata Hyaloscyphaceae
 U. elegantula  = Lasiobelonium elegantulum Solenopeziaceae
 U. epicalamia  = Crocicreas epicalamia Helotiales
 U. eurotioides  = Unguiculella eurotioides Hyaloscyphaceae
 U. flaveola  = Hyaloscypha flaveola Hyaloscyphaceae
 U. fugiens  = Cistella fugiens Helotiales
 U. graminicola  = Clavidisculum graminicola Hyaloscyphaceae
 U. hamulata  = Hyalacrotes hamulata Calloriaceae
 U. ilicis  = Calycellina ilicis Pezizellaceae
 U. incarnatina  = Unguiculella incarnatina Hyaloscyphaceae
 U. lachnobrachya  = Calycellina lachnobrachya Pezizellaceae
 U. leuconica  = Hyaloscypha leuconica Hyaloscyphaceae
 U. leucostoma  = Solenopezia leucostoma Solenopeziaceae
 U. mali  = Cistella mali Helotiales
 U. melaxantha  = Tryblidaria melaxantha Patellariaceae
 U. micacea  = Psilachnum micaceum Pezizellaceae
 U. miliaris  = Scutula miliaris Byssolomataceae
 U. misella  = Fuscolachnum misellum Hyphodiscaceae
 U. occulta  = Psilachnum occultum Pezizellaceae
 U. paradoxa  = Clibanites paradoxus Bionectriaceae
 U. paulula  = Diplonaevia paulula Calloriaceae
 U. pseudopani  = Hyalacrotes pseudopani Calloriaceae
 U. pteridis  = Fuscolachnum pteridis Hyphodiscaceae
 U. puberula  = Calycellina punctata Pezizellaceae
 U. pulveracea  = Pyrenopeziza pulveracea Ploettnerulaceae
 U. richonis  = Dematioscypha richonis Hyaloscyphaceae
 U. scirpicola  = Micropeziza scirpicola Pezizellaceae
 U. scrupulosa  = Hyalopeziza millepunctata Hyaloscyphaceae
 U. scrupulosa var. carpini  = Hyalopeziza millepunctata Hyaloscyphaceae
 U. scrupulosa var. caulia  = Hyalopeziza millepunctata Hyaloscyphaceae
 U. spiraeae  = Calycellina spiraeae Pezizellaceae
 U. stereicola  = Cistellina stereicola Hyphodiscaceae
 U. stevensonii  = Hyaloscypha aureliella Hyaloscyphaceae
 U. subglobosa  = Lachnella subglobosa Niaceae
 U. tami  = Psilachnum tami Pezizellaceae
 U. tami var. humuli  = Clavidisculum humuli Hyaloscyphaceae
 U. tenuicula  = Helotium tenuiculum Tricladiaceae
 U. trichodea  = Hyalopeziza trichodea Hyaloscyphaceae
 U. ulmariae  = Pseudohelotium ulmariae Helotiaceae
 U. versicolor  = Psilachnum chrysostigmum Pezizellaceae
 U. viburnicola  = Pyrenopeziza commoda Ploettnerulaceae
 U. winteriana  = Hyalopeziza winteriana Hyaloscyphaceae

References

External links
Urceolella at Index Fungorum

Hyaloscyphaceae